XCP is a three-letter abbreviation which may refer to:

 Copper, the ISO 4217 code for trading the metal
 Extended Copy Protection, a CD copy protection technique used on some Sony CD albums
 Xen Cloud Platform, open-source virtualization software
 Xavier College Preparatory (Arizona)
 Universal Measurement and Calibration Protocol, ASAM  e.V. standard abbreviated XCP
  Composition Platform, a Documentum application development platform
 The native currency of Counterparty
 Jabber XCP, a commercial product which is an implementation of XMPP. Acquired  by Cisco Systems in 2008.